Leisen Michelle Jobe (born 20 February 1973) is a retired female field hockey player from New Zealand.

She was born in Whangarei, Northland. She competed at the 2004 Summer Olympics, and with The Black Sticks team she finished in sixth place. She also competed in other tournaments.

References

External links
 

1973 births
Living people
New Zealand female field hockey players
Field hockey players at the 2004 Summer Olympics
Olympic field hockey players of New Zealand
Field hockey players from Whangārei
20th-century New Zealand women
21st-century New Zealand women